Bhupendrasinh Prabhatsinh Solanki (born 26 March 1954) was a member of the 14th Lok Sabha of India. He represented the Godhra constituency of Gujarat and is a member of the Bharatiya Janata Party.

External links
 Official biographical sketch in Parliament of India website

1954 births
Living people
Bharatiya Janata Party politicians from Gujarat
India MPs 2004–2009
People from Panchmahal district
India MPs 1999–2004
Lok Sabha members from Gujarat